Pendimethalin is an herbicide of the dinitroaniline class used in premergence and postemergence applications to control annual grasses and certain broadleaf weeds. It inhibits cell division and cell elongation. Pendimethalin is listed in the K1-group according to the Herbicide Resistance Action Committee (HRAC) classification and is approved in Europe, North America, South America, Africa, Asia and Oceania for different crops including cereals (wheat, barley, rye, triticale), corn, soybeans, rice, potato, legumes, fruits, vegetables, nuts as well as lawns and ornamental plants.

Use
Pendimethalin protects crops like wheat, corn, soybeans, potatoes, cabbage, peas, carrots, and asparagus. It is used to control annual grasses and certain broadleaf weeds which interfere with growth, development, yield and quality of agricultural and horticultural crops by competing on nutrients, water and light.

In areas where weed infestation is particularly high, yield losses can render wheat production economically unviable. In addition to wheat, a large number of crops are grown in Europe that are a relatively small percentage of total agricultural output. Herbicide options are limited for these minor crops, with few effective herbicides available in the vegetable sector. Long-term field studies performed in Germany by governmental research and advisory institutes together with farmers rank Pendimethalin as an efficient herbicide to control blackgrass, regarding to weed control efficacy, crop yield, treatment costs and environmental impact.

Mode of action
Pendimethalin acts both pre-emergence, that is before weed seedlings have emerged, and early post-emergence. Pendimethalin inhibits root and shoot growth. It controls the weed population and prevents weeds from emerging, particularly during the crucial development phase of the crop. Its primary mode of action is to prevent plant cell division and elongation in susceptible species. In the HRAC classification of herbicides according their mode of action, pendimethalin is listed in group K1.

Risk factor for developing pancreatic cancer 
In a controversial study, published in the International Journal of Cancer, it has been suggested that Pendimethalin exposure is associated with higher incidence of pancreatic cancer. No compelling data exists that it causes pancreatic or any other cancer. It remains in good standing with the regulatory agencies in virtually all world markets, again where it is enormously economically important and would cost large amounts of resources to stop being used.

Resistance 
Herbicide resistance typically increases production costs and limits options for herbicide selection, cultivations and rotations. Up to 2009 Pendimethalin did not show resistance. It is not cross-resistant with other grass weed herbicides. This means that Pendimethalin supports the effects of other supplementary grass weed herbicides that use a different mode of action. Lolium rigidum has evolved resistance to pendimethalin, at least in part due to increased cytochrome P450 activity.

Registrative status
Pendimethalin is registered globally for a wide range of crops, according to human and environmental safety standards by the European Commission, US-EPA, Canada-PMRA, Japan, Brazil-ANVISA and others.

Tradenames
Tradenames include Satellite, Halts, Prowl, PRE-M, Stomp, Stealth and Pendulum, Hilpendi etc.

References

External links 
 

Anilines
Nitrobenzenes
Endocrine disruptors
Preemergent herbicides
Alkyl-substituted benzenes
Secondary amines